MasterChef Croatia (MasterChef Hrvatska) is a Croatian competitive reality television cooking show based on the original British version of MasterChef. The first episode aired on 21 March 2011 on Nova TV. Host of the first season of Croatian MasterChef is Jasna Nanut.

Judges

The judges in the first season were Tomislav Gretić, famous Croatian chef, Mate Janković, one of the youngest Croatian chefs and Radovan Marčić, director and writer.

The winner of the first season was Šime Sušić.

The winner of the second season is Nikola Lesar.

The winner of the third season is Iva Pehar.

The winner of the forth season is Ivan Temšić.

The winner of the fifth season is Maja Šabić.

Seasons

References

External links
Official Website (in Croatian)

Croatia
Croatian reality television series
2011 Croatian television series debuts
2011 Croatian television series endings
Non-British television series based on British television series
Nova TV (Croatia) original programming